Green Bay Packers, Inc. is the publicly held nonprofit corporation that owns the National Football League (NFL)'s Green Bay Packers football franchise, based in Green Bay, Wisconsin. Established in 1923 as the Green Bay Football Corporation, the company received its current legal name in 1935.

The Packers are the only publicly owned major professional sports franchise in the United States. Rather than being the property of an individual, partnership, or corporate entity, they are held as of 2022 by 537,460 stockholders. No one is allowed to hold more than 200,000 shares, which represents approximately four percent of the 5,011,558 shares currently outstanding. It is this broad-based community support and non-profit structure which has kept the team in Green Bay for over a century in spite of being the smallest market in all of North American major professional sports.

Green Bay is the only team with this public form of ownership structure in the NFL, grandfathered when the NFL's current ownership policy stipulating a maximum of 32 owners per team, with one holding a minimum 30% stake, was established in the 1980s. As a publicly held nonprofit, the Packers are also the only North American major league sports franchise to release its financial balance sheet every year.

Board of directors
The Green Bay Packers Board of Directors is the organization that serves as the owner of record for the Green Bay Packers of the National Football League (NFL).

The Packers have been a publicly owned, non-profit corporation since August 18, 1923. The corporation currently has approximately 537,460 stockholders, who collectively own approximately 5,200,000 shares of stock following the sixth stock sale in 2021. There have been six stock sales, in 1923, 1935, 1950, 1997, 2011, and 2021. Shares in 1923 sold for $5 apiece (approximately $75 in 2020 dollars), while in 1997 they were sold at $200 each, $250 each in 2011, and $300 each in 2021.

The NFL does not allow corporate ownership of clubs, requiring every club to be wholly owned by either a single owner or a small group of owners, one of whom must hold a one-third stake in the team. The Packers are granted an exemption to this rule, as they have been a publicly owned corporation since before the rule was in place.

The corporation is governed by a seven-member executive committee, elected from among the board of directors. The committee directs corporate management, approves major capital expenditures, establishes board policy, and monitors performance of management in conducting the business and affairs of the corporation.

The elected president, currently Mark H. Murphy, represents the corporation at NFL owners meetings and other league functions. The president is the only officer who receives compensation. The balance of the committee sits gratis.

At the time of his death, Green Bay Press-Gazette publisher Michael Gage was said to be the largest shareholder of the team.

Shareholder rights
Even though it is referred to as "common stock" in corporate offering documents, a share of Packers stock does not share the same rights traditionally associated with common or preferred stock. It does not include an equity interest, does not pay dividends, cannot be traded, and has no protection under securities law. It also confers no season-ticket purchasing privileges. Shareholders receive nothing more than voting rights, an invitation to the corporation's annual meeting, and an opportunity to purchase exclusive shareholder-only merchandise.

Shares cannot be resold, except back to the team for a fraction of the original price. While new shares can be given as gifts, transfers are technically allowed only between immediate family members once ownership has been established.

Stock sales

There have been six stock issues over the history of the Packers organization:
1923: Shares of stock were first sold to establish the club as an corporation. A total of $5,000 was raised through the sale of 1,000 shares at $5 apiece. Each stockholder was required to buy six season tickets and buying five stocks for $25 also came with a box seat for each home game. To ensure that there could never be any financial inducement for shareholders to move the club outside Green Bay, the original articles of incorporation for the Green Bay Football Corporation stipulated that in the event of the sale of the franchise, all profits from the sale be donated to the Sullivan-Wallen Post of the American Legion, earmarked for the purpose of building "a proper soldier's memorial." At the November 1997 annual meeting, shareholders voted to change the beneficiary to the Green Bay Packers Foundation, established to make donations to charities and institutions throughout Wisconsin.
1935: A second stock offering, at $25 per share, was conducted to raise $15,000 after the corporation had gone into receivership following a lost lawsuit brought by an injured fan at a 1931 game. The nonprofit Green Bay Football Corporation was then reorganized as the Green Bay Packers, Inc., the present company, with 300 shares of stock outstanding.
1950: A third offering was held to prevent the team from becoming insolvent or moving out of Green Bay in the face of competition from the All-America Football Conference and founder Curly Lambeau’s departure after a 30-year reign as coach. Club officers amended corporation's bylaws to permit up to 10,000 total shares of stock to be held. To ensure no individual could assume control, a limit of 200 shares per stockholder was implemented and the number of directors increased from 15 to 25. Approximately half the potential 9,700 new shares were sold, raising over $118,000 on some 4,700 $25 shares. The team also sold 9 half-shares for $12.50 and sold or gifted 50 unsold stocks from this sale from 1951 to 1959. 
1997–98: The club's then-1,940 shareholders voted to create one million new shares, simultaneously giving themselves a thousand-to-one split. The net effect was to ensure that existing shareholders retained the vast majority of voting power. An offering of 400,000 shares followed to raise money for Lambeau Field redevelopment.  Running for 17 weeks from late 1997 to March 16, 1998, it raised over $24 million through the purchase of 120,010 shares at $200 apiece by 105,989 new shareholders.
2011: To raise money for a large $143-million Lambeau Field expansion, which included approximately 6,700 new seats, new high-definition video boards, a new sound system, and two new gates, a fifth stock sale began on December 6, 2011. Demand exceeded expectations, and the original 250,000-share limit was increased by 30,000. By the offering's end on February 29, 2012, over $64 million had been raised through 250,000 buyers purchasing 269,000 shares at $250 apiece. Buyers were from all 50 U.S. states, and for the first time, sales were briefly allowed in Canada, adding around 2,000 shareholders. Approximately 99% of the shares were purchased online. In the summer of 2011, when the team traveled to the White House to celebrate their Super Bowl XLV victory, Charles Woodson presented President of the United States Barack Obama, a Chicago Bears fan, with a share of the team stock.
2021-22: A sixth stock sale began on November 16, 2021, consisting of 300,000 shares to be sold at $300 apiece. Proceeds of the sale were announced to be spent towards new video boards and concourse upgrades, among other projects at Lambeau Field. 111,000 shares (equating to $36 million) were sold in the first two days. Sale of stock was initially limited to residents of the United States (excluding residents of American Samoa and the Northern Mariana Islands); the sale was expanded to include residents of Canada after four days, with 126,000 shares having been sold prior to that point. The sale concluded on February 25, 2022, with $64 million being raised through the sale of 194,537 shares, adding 176,160 new shareholders. Among the new shareholders were Packers players A. J. Dillon, Aaron Jones, and Kurt Benkert.

Green Bay Packers Foundation

The team created the Green Bay Packers Foundation in December 1986. It assists in a wide variety of activities and programs benefiting education, civic affairs, health services, human services and youth-related programs.

At the team's 1997 annual stockholders meeting, the foundation was designated, in place of a Sullivan-Wallen Post soldiers memorial, as recipient of any residual assets upon the team's sale or dissolution.

References

Footnotes

 
1923 establishments in Wisconsin
National Football League owners